Oakwood is the name of the following places in the U.S. state of Ohio:

Oakwood, Montgomery County, Ohio, a city
Oakwood, Cuyahoga County, Ohio, a village
Oakwood, Paulding County, Ohio, a village
Oakwood (Newark, Ohio), a Gothic revival house listed on the National Register of Historic Places

See also
Oakwood (disambiguation)